Umesh Kamat (born 12 December 1978) is an Indian actor and model, who predominantly works in Marathi regional films, Marathi television series, Marathi plays and TV commercials.

He is known as a star of daily soaps with a series of great daily soaps in recent years. Some of his memorable roles are Adinath Shastri from Asambhav, Nishad from Shubham Karoti. But, the most popular role of him was of Adv. Om Chaudhary in Eka Lagnachi Teesri Goshta, aired in 2013, in which he was paired with Spruha Joshi. His recent film was Mumbai Time, which was released in February 2016.

Personal life
Kamat married to Priya Bapat in 2011.

Media image

Filmography

Films

Theatre

Television

Web series

References

External links

Umesh Kamat Instagram

Marathi actors
Indian male film actors
1977 births
Living people
Male actors in Marathi television